Lennart Svensson may refer to:
 Lennart Svensson (footballer)
 Lennart Svensson (wrestler)